Phascolosoma granulatum is a species of peanut worm in the family Phascolosomatidae. It is found in shallow water in the northeastern Atlantic Ocean and the Mediterranean Sea.

Description
The trunk is robust and tapers towards the posterior. The eversible introvert has a crescent-shaped bundle of 12 to 60 tentacles near its tip; these tentacles are located above the mouth and surround the large nuchal organ. Below the oral disc is a swollen collar with up to 60 rings of curved hooks with broad triangular bases. The posterior rings are often partially worn away. The surface of the trunk is covered with dome-shaped papillae (fleshy projections from the body wall) of various sizes, each tipped with a dark coloured ring. The largest papillae are at the base of the introvert and at the foot of the trunk and are often a darker colour than the remainder. Small individual worms tend to have dark banding on the introvert. In general the colouring and appearance of this species is quite variable which probably explains why it has so many synonyms.

Distribution and habitat
P. granulatum is native to the northeastern Atlantic Ocean and the Mediterranean Sea. It has been recorded in Norway but its main range extends from the British Isles southwards to the Cape Verde Islands and the Mediterranean Sea. In the British Isles, it is mainly found on the western coast of Ireland as well as in Shetland, Orkney and the Hebrides, and sporadically elsewhere. Reports that it occurs in the Indian Ocean are now thought to refer to Phascolosoma stephensoni.

References

Sipunculans
Fauna of the Atlantic Ocean
Fauna of the Mediterranean Sea
Animals described in 1828
Taxa named by Friedrich Sigismund Leuckart